Rado Vidošić (born 25 September 1961) is an Australian football (soccer) manager, who is currently the manager at A-League club Melbourne City.

Managerial career

Brisbane Roar
Vidošić had served as the assistant coach of Brisbane Roar since their inaugural A-League season. He served as the club's caretaker manager from 10 October 2009 to 15 October 2009 after manager Frank Farina was sacked due to drink-driving charges. He was succeeded by former Australia U-20 team manager Ange Postecoglou. On 25 April 2012, he was named as the new manager of Brisbane, following the departure of Ange Postecoglou, who left to manage his hometown club Melbourne Victory.

On 18 December 2012, just 11 games into the season, after a poor run of results in the 2012–13 season and with the Roar sitting 9th out of 10 teams on the ladder, Vidošić was reassigned to the role of technical director and was replaced by Melbourne Victory W-League manager Mike Mulvey as interim coach until May 2013.

Sydney FC
In June 2013, Sydney FC signed Vidošić as Assistant Coach. working alongside Frank Farina once again.

Return to Brisbane Roar
In December 2014, Sydney FC announced that Vidošić had returned to Brisbane for personal reasons.  Despite being a former head coach and technical director, he subsequently took the unusual step of taking up an assistant coaching role with his former club Brisbane Roar

Melbourne Victory
On 13 July 2015, Vidošić joined Melbourne Victory as an assistant coach, following the resignation of Jean-Paul de Marigny.
On 31 May 2016, after one season at the club, Vidošić left his role as the result of the return of former assistant coach de Marigny.

Wellington Phoenix
On 7 June 2017, Vidošić was announced as the assistant coach of Wellington Phoenix working alongside Darije Kalezić who was announced as the new head coach. On 20 December 2017, Vidošić left the club together with his son Dario.

Melbourne City
In July 2018, Vidosic joined Melbourne City as the club’s technical director and head coach of the W-League team.

On 23 November 2022, after Patrick Kisnorbo was announced as manager of French top division side, and fellow City Football Group club, Troyes, Vidosic was appointed caretaker manager of Melbourne City. In February 2023, Vidosic was appointed Men's head coach on a permanent basis.

Personal life
His son is Australia national football team and Melbourne City player Dario Vidošić. On 4 November 2012, Vidošić managed the Brisbane Roar against Dario's Adelaide United at Suncorp Stadium, with Dario's goal in the 3rd minute of the match securing victory for Adelaide United over his father's team.

Managerial Statistics

References

Living people
Australian soccer coaches
A-League Men managers
Brisbane Roar FC managers
1961 births
Australian people of Croatian descent